The McDougall Duluth Shipbuilding Company was a large-scale wartime ship manufacturing shipyard, located at the city of Riverside, near Duluth. McDougall Duluth Shipbuilding was at 110 Spring Street, Duluth, Minnesota, now the site of the West Duluth's Spirit Lake Marina. The shipyard was located on St. Louis River Estuary at western part of Lake Superior. McDougall Duluth Shipbuilding Company was found by Alexander McDougall (1845-1923) in 1917 to built ships for World War I. McDougall Duluth Shipbuilding Company and the Superior Shipbuilding Company (now Fraser Shipyards) were called the Twin Ports shipbuilding industry of Minnesota and Wisconsin. Once built the ships can travel to the Atlantic Ocean through the Great Lakes and the Saint Lawrence Seaway.

History

In 1890 iron ore was discovered on the Mesabi Range, this turned Duluth into a major shipping port. Duluth Works and other steel plants opened. The supply of steel opened western Duluth to shipbuilding. Before McDougall Duluth Shipbuilding Company opened in 1917, Alexander McDougall built 7 whaleback barges of his own new design in Duluth starting in 1887. With the success of the whaleback barge, Alexander McDougall opened the first shipyard on Lake Superior, (were Fraser Shipyards is now) in December 1891, that built whalebacks, like the Model 101, and steamships used for bulk cargo and passenger ships on the Great Lakes. His company was the American Steel Barge Company, which he sold in 1900 and became the Superior Shipbuilding Company, later this became the Knudsen Brothers Shipbuilding & Dry Dock Company and in 1955 the Fraser Shipyards.
Samples of Alexander McDougall whalebacks:

McDougall Duluth Shipbuilding Company

Alexander McDougall opened the McDougall Duluth Shipbuilding Company due to the demand for ships for World War I. The new McDougall Duluth Shipyard was 6 miles west of his former yard on Lake Superior. Due to the growing steel and ship industries, many immigrates came to Duluth. The West Duluth riverfront had two large companies and company towns: U.S. Steel Works's city of Morgan Park that opened in 1913 and McDougall's city of Riverside that opened in 1917, with 3,000 living there. Riverside had for its workers an 800-seat theater, hospital, clubhouse, general store, monthly newspaper Riverside Review and boathouse. The town's school open in 1920 and closed in 1982.  Alexander McDougall's son, Alexander Miller McDougall (1884-1951), and Julius H. Barnes did the day-to-day running of the town and shipyard. In 1922 Barnes also became the president of the U. S. Chamber of Commerce.

Some of ships built at McDougall Duluth Shipbuilding Company:

1918 Oiler tanker
  1917-1918

1918 Coal ships for World War I:

Private contracts:
The USS Lakemoor or USS Lake Moor (Hull # 2 ID-215770) was torpedoed and sank on April 11, 1918, on maiden voyage as Navy coal ship (ID 2180), during World War I by U-boat  in the Irish sea, off Corsewall Lighthouse, Scotland. Lost were 46 crew members. Ship named after Lakemoor, Illinois. 
The USS Lake Traverse (ID-2782) (Hull #3) (21615), Navy coal ship 1918–1919, In 1925 operated as private ship, took on water due steel plate failure and sank near Tortuga Island, Haiti in the Caribbean on July 6, 1955. Ordered as SS War Centaur, name changed before delivery in April 1918. Named after Lake Traverse.
War contracts:
 
 
 
The USS Lake Portage (Hull# 4) (216409) was torpedoed and sank on August 3, 1918, during World War I by  just south of Audierne, France. Lost were three crew members and six with burns.
The USS Lake Indian (ID-4215-A) (216990), no Navy service, took on water and sank on January 25, 1927, near Sand Key Light, Florida.
 SS Lake Markham (Hull # 5 ID 216587, ID-4215-C) ordered as SS Allette, no Navy service, SS Chicago in 1927, scrapped in 1937.
 SS Lake Helen (Hull # 8 ID 216892) ordered as, before delivery SS Macon. Renamed SS York in 1926, SS Skogak in  1929, SS Kama in 1933, and scrapped in 1970 

1919 Cargo ships 3,600 DTW: Emergency Fleet ship

Cedar Spring
Ceralvo (wrecked 1941)
Cerosco
Cerro Gordo
Chamberino (wrecked 1952)
Chamblee (sunk by mine 1945)
Chaperel
Chantier (sunk 1933)
Chappell (bombed and sunk 1943)
Chautauqua (wrecked 1948)

1919-1920 Cargo ships 4,145 DTW:

Lake Flagon
Lake Flagstaff (torpedoed and sunk 1942)
Lake Flambeau (torpedoed and sunk 1942) 
Lake Flanders (sunk 1930)
Lake Flatonia
Lake Flattery (torpedoed sank 1942)
Lake Strymon
La Crosse
Fargo
Sioux Falls
Great Falls (wrecked 1942)
Lake Floravista (wrecked 1952)
Lake Florian (torpedoed and sunk 1942)
Lake Floris (torpedoed and sunk 1942)
Lake Flournoy (torpedoed and sunk 1942)

Frederickstads type ship for private owners:
1920 Tanker   2417 DWT 
Theodore F. Reynolds (sunk)
Julius Kessler
Philip Publicker
1920 Cargo 3,350 DWT:
Josefa
Antonio (torpedoed and sunk 1942)
Canal motorship 1921 1,040 DWT, for New York State Barge Canal 
SS Day Peckinpaugh / I.L.I. 101, May 1921. now museum ship
I.L.I. 102, May 1921. 
I.L.I. 103, May 1921. 
I.L.I. 104, May 1921. 
I.L.I. 105, July 1921  (Hull # 45, last McDougall Duluth ship)

Barnes-Duluth Shipbuilding

Julius H. Barnes purchased the shipyard from McDougall in 1922 and renamed it Barnes-Duluth Shipbuilding. The shipyard continued to build private ships between the world wars. For World War II the yard built fully outfitted warships.
Some of Barnes-Duluth Shipbuilding ships:

Coastal tanker
In 1943 Barnes-Duluth built 12 T1-M-A1 tanker also called a small a Coastal tanker. The tanker was diesel-powered with: 800 hp, 10 knots max. Tonnage Deadweight: 1,600, Tonnage Full Load: 2,900, Dimensions: 221 feet long, Width 37 ft. The 12 ships were loaned to Britain under Lease/ Lend terms.

Tarentum (Hull # 1, May 1943)
Titusville
Mannington
Salt Creek
Glen Pool
Jennings
Tonkawa
Cromwell
Benton Field
Rio Bravo (torpedoed and sunk 1942)
Walnut Bend
Loma Novia

Lake tankers, 3,401 DWT built in 1943:

Carpito
San Joaquin (wrecked 1960)
Temblador
San Cristobal (sunk 1965)
Guarico
Guiria
Valera (torpedoed and sunk 1944) 

Cargo ship type N3-S-A2 2,757 DWT, built in 1944:

David R. Le Craw (Sunk 1958)
James Miller
Samuel Samuels (Sunk 1965)
Joseph Hamilton
John D. Whidden
George W. Brown
George Crocker
Frank Dale (June 1944, Hull # 27, last Barnes-Duluth ship)

Walter Butler Shipbuilders

Walter Butler purchased the shipyard from Barnes in 1943 and renamed it Walter Butler Shipbuilders.
For World War II Walter Butler Shipbuilders Duluth built under the Emergency Shipbuilding Program C1-M type ships. The Duluth yard closed in 1945, as all war contacts ended and there was a surplus of ships at the end of the war. Walter Butler also had a shipyard in Superior, Wisconsin from 1942 to 1945 for building warships. Walter Butler shipbuilding was a family company started in 1877 as the Butler Brothers Shipbuilders, then Walter Butler Shipbuilders Inc. the brother pass the yard to Robert Butler (1897-1955).

Some of Walter Butler Shipbuilders Duluth ships:

C1-M-AV1 cargo ships, 2239 tons, 3,805 DWT:

  (Hull # 328, August 1944)

  (wrecked 1946)

Kenneth E. Gruennert  (wrecked 1953)
 
Joe P. Martinez
 
Alexander R. Nininger, Jr.
Roband Hitch
 

 

 

 (Hull # 345, August 1945, last Walter Butler Duluth ship)

Spirit Lake Marina
The current site is the Spirit Lake Marina, also called West Duluth Marina, which has docks and berths for recreational boats on the river and lake. Today there are only two buildings left standing from the original shipyard campus of over two dozen buildings.

Symphony Boat Company
In 2014, commercial boat building started again, Symphony Boat Company is building recreational boats at the marina. The shipyard is active for the first time since 1945.

Gallery

Panel photos of McDougall Duluth Shipbuilding Company in 1918: 

Riverside Company Town Band and Baseball team in 1918, workers of the McDougall Duluth Shipbuilding Company. , The band played noon lunchtime concerts during the workweek and played at the 1919 Minnesota State Fair. Riverside Company Town had two baseball teams: The Cubs of the shipyard and the Giants from the iron works from US steel.

Map of Riverside company town in 1918 and the McDougall Duluth Shipbuilding shipyard:

 	
Julius H. Barnes, owner of Barnes-Duluth Shipbuilding from 1922 to 1943

See also
Great Lakes Engineering Works
Collingwood Shipbuilding Company
Defoe Shipbuilding Company
Manitowoc Shipbuilding Company
American Ship Building Company
 Attack on Pearl Harbor

References

Great Lakes
Lake Superior
United States home front during World War II
Defunct shipbuilding companies of the United States
McDougall Duluth Shipbuilding